Hanna Rycharska (born 1 July 1988), née Sądej, is a Polish handball player for AZS Politechnika Koszalin and the Polish national team.

She competed at the 2015 World Women's Handball Championship in Denmark. and the 2017  championship.

References

1988 births
Living people
Polish female handball players
Place of birth missing (living people)
21st-century Polish women